Radioconus is a genus of small air-breathing land snails, terrestrial pulmonate gastropod mollusks in the family Charopidae.

Species
Species within the genus Radioconus include:
 Radioconus goeldi
 Radioconus riochcoensis

References

 GBIF info

 
Charopidae
Taxonomy articles created by Polbot